"Si tu partais" is a French song written by Michel Emer, and popularised by Edith Piaf (1947). English lyrics were written by Geoffrey Parsons.

Versions
Frankie Laine on Foreign Affair 1958
Les Planètes Canada	1967
Udo Jürgens  France	1964
"If You Go" ("Si Tu Partais")	Odette (singer)  MGM  USA	 
"If You Go" ("Si Tu Partais")	Roger Williams	1968
"If You Go" ("Si Tu Partais")	Vera Lynn	1952
 "Si Tu Partais" / "If You Go" – Tina May on Tina May Sings Piaf (2011)
 "Si Tu Partais" / "If You Go" – Tina May on My Kinda Love (2014)

References

1947 songs